Weigel's toad (Notaden weigeli) is a species of frog in the family Limnodynastidae.
It is endemic to Australia.
Its natural habitats are subtropical or tropical dry shrubland, subtropical or tropical dry lowland grassland, intermittent freshwater marshes, and rocky areas.

References

Notaden
Amphibians of Western Australia
Amphibians described in 1987
Taxonomy articles created by Polbot
Frogs of Australia